The Dreischeibenhaus (also known as the Dreischeibenhochhaus) is a 95-metre office building in August-Thyssen-Straße in the Hofgarten district of the Düsseldorf city centre. It was also known as the Thyssenhaus or Thyssen-Hochhaus owing to its former use as the headquarters of the Thyssen and ThyssenKrupp groups.  It is among the most significant examples of post-war modernist International style and a symbol of the so-called Wirtschaftswunder, or 'economic miracle' of post-war Germany, and contrasts with the neighbouring Düsseldorfer Schauspielhaus on Gustaf-Gründgens-Platz. Dreischeibenhaus, The "Three Plates Building" (a rough translation of its name in German), was one of the first skyscrapers to be completed in Germany after WW2.

In the early 1990s the building was completely refurbished including a new curtain wall matching the appearance of the original, but with improved thermal performance and moisture control.

After another complete renovation under the direction of Düsseldorf HPP Architects in 2013, the skyscraper now offers 35,000 m2 of gross floor area.

Notes

References
 Werner Durth: Düsseldorf: Demonstration der Modernität. In: Klaus von Beyme et al., ed. Neue Städte aus Ruinen. Deutscher Städtebau der Nachkriegszeit. Munich: Prestel, 1992, pp. 239–40.
 "Dreischeibenhaus für 72 Millionen Euro verkauft" Rheinische Post, 2 June 2011.
 "Das Dreischeibenhaus wird umgebaut" Rheinische Post, 4 June 2011.
 "Dreischeibenhaus an Schwarz-Schütte" Rheinische Post, 15 June 2011.
 Werner Durth: Deutsche Architekten. Biographische Verflechtungen 1900–1970. Deutscher Taschenbuch Verlag, München 1992, pp. 456–57.
 Adolf Max Vogt, Ulrike Jehle-Schulte Strathaus, Bruno Reichlin: Architektur 1940–1980. Frankfurt: Propyläen, 1980, Plate 103, p. 127 and text pp. 38, 215.
 Werner Müller, Gunther Vogel: DTV-Atlas zur Baukunst, Vol. 2 (Baugeschichte von der Romantik bis zur Gegenwart), 2nd ed. Munich: Deutscher Taschenbuch Verlag, 1981, pp. 546–47.
 Rolf Purpar: Kunststadt Düsseldorf. Objekte und Denkmäler im Stadtbild. 2nd ed. Düsseldorf: Grupello Verlag, 2009, p. 84.

Further reading
 Heike Werner: Architektur und Geschichte in Deutschland. München 2006, .
 Roland Kanz: Architekturführer Düsseldorf. Berlin 2001, .
 Falk Jaeger: Bauen in Deutschland. Stuttgart 1985, .
 Paul Ernst Wentz: Architekturführer Düsseldorf. Droste Verlag, Düsseldorf 1975, Objektnr. 13, .

External links

 skyscraperpage.com description of Dreischeibenhaus

Skyscrapers in Düsseldorf
International Style (architecture)
Skyscraper office buildings in Germany
Office buildings completed in 1960